The 2014 Warsaw Cup was a senior international figure skating competition held in November 2014 in Warsaw, Poland. It was part of the 2014–15 ISU Challenger Series. Medals were awarded in the disciplines of men's singles, ladies' singles, pair skating, and ice dancing.

Results

Men

Ladies

Pairs

Ice dancing

References

External links
 
 2014 Warsaw Cup results

Warsaw Cup
Warsaw Cup, 2014
Warsaw Cup